Tommy Haas was the defending champion, but lost in the second round to Benjamin Becker.

Steve Darcis won in the final 6–3, 7–6(7–5), against Robin Söderling.

Seeds

Draw

Finals

Top half

Bottom half

External links
 Draw
 Qualifying Draw

2008 ATP Tour
Singles
2008 in sports in Tennessee